This page indexes the individual year in comics pages. Each year is annotated with significant events as reference points.


2010s - 2000s - 1990s - 1980s - 1970s - 1960s - 1950s - 1940s - 1930s -
Pre-1930s

Pre-1930s
 Before 1900s in comics
 1900s in comics - debut: Happy Hooligan, Little Jimmy, Little Nemo in Slumberland
 1910s in comics - debut: Krazy Kat, Polly and Her Pals
 1920s in comics - debut: The Adventures of Tintin, Little Orphan Annie, Skippy, Rupert Bear, Popeye

1930s

1930 in comics - debut: Blondie, Scorchy Smith, Quick et Flupke; debut as comic strip: Mickey Mouse
1931 in comics - debut: The Little King, Dick Tracy, Norakuro
1932 in comics - debut: Alley Oop, Jane, Conan the Barbarian; debut as comic strip: Silly Symphony
1933 in comics - debut: Dickie Dare, Brick Bradford
1934 in comics - debut: Li'l Abner, Flash Gordon, Mandrake the Magician, Secret Agent X-9, Terry and the Pirates, Sally the Sleuth; appearance: Snuffy Smith in Barney Google; published: Le Journal de Mickey; Establishment of DC Comics
1935 in comics - debut: Hejji, King of the Royal Mounted, Barney Baxter; published: New Fun Comics #1, New Comics #1
1936 in comics - debut: Jo, Zette et Jocko, The Phantom, The Clock, Big Chief Wahoo
1937 in comics - debut: Prince Valiant, Sheena, Queen of the Jungle, Abbie an' Slats, Torchy Brown; debut as comic strip: Donald Duck, Desperate Dan; published: Detective Comics #1 The Dandy #1
1938 in comics -  debut: Spirou, Tif, The Addams Family, Superman; published: Le Journal de Spirou, Action Comics #1, The Beano #1
1939 in comics - debut: Batman; published: Superman #1 (reprints from Action Comics); Establishment of Marvel Comics

1940s

1940 in comics - debut: Green Lantern, Flash, Robin, Joker, Catwoman, The Spirit, Lady Luck, Mr. Mystic, Willie and Joe, Brenda Starr, Reporter, Daredevil (Lev Gleason Publications), Captain Marvel later named Shazam; published: Flash Comics #1
1941 in comics - debut: Penguin, Sad Sack, Jean Valhardi, Plastic Man, Captain America, Wonder Woman, Aquaman, Gordo; appearance: Pogo Possum in Animal Comics; published: Captain America Comics #1
1942 in comics - debut: Two-Face, The Pie-face Prince of Pretzelburg, Archie Comics
1943 in comics - debut: Garth, Claire Voyant, Male Call, Buz Sawyer
1944 in comics - debut: Johnny Hazard
1945 in comics - debut: Suske en Wiske; published: Vaillant #1
1946 in comics - debut: Lucky Luke, Blake et Mortimer, Rip Kirby; published: Tintin magazine #1
1947 in comics - debut: Steve Canyon, Black Canary, Johan
1948 in comics - debut: Riddler, Alix, Tex Willer, Pogo
1949 in comics - debut:

1950s

1950 in comics - debut: Peanuts, Dan Dare, Captain Pugwash, It Rhymes with Lust
1951 in comics - debut: Dennis the Menace (U.S. comic strip)
1952 in comics - debut: Astro Boy; appearance: Marsupilami in Spirou et Fantasio; published: Mad #1
1953 in comics - debut: El Sargento Kirk 
1954 in comics - debut: Moomin, Marmaduke, Jerry Spring; published: Misterix #1
1955 in comics - debut: Modeste et Pompon, Martian Manhunter, Ric Hochet
1956 in comics - debut: The Flash, ushering in the Silver Age of Comics
1957 in comics - debut: Gaston Lagaffe, El Eternauta, Ernie Pike; published: Hora Cero #1
1958 in comics - debut: B.C., Oumpah-pah, Mort & Phil, Rick O'Shay; debut as comic strip: James Bond; appearance: Les Schtroumpfs in Johan et Pirlouit
1959 in comics - debut: Clifton, Boule et Bill, Supergirl, Astérix, Monica's Gang; published: Pilote magazine #1

1960s

1960 in comics - debut: Justice League 
1961 in comics - debut: Fantastic Four #1, Spy vs. Spy, Batgirl
1962 in comics - debut: Mort Cinder, Iznogoud, Spider-Man, Hulk, Thor, Little Annie Fanny, Valiant, Diabolik
1963 in comics - debut: Achille Talon, Blueberry, Modesty Blaise, X-Men, The Avengers, Doctor Strange, Iron Man; published: The Amazing Spider-Man #1;
1964 in comics - debut: Mafalda, The Wizard of Id, Zatanna, Black Widow, Teen Titans
1965 in comics - debut: Philémon; appearance: Valentina in Neutron; published: Linus
1966 in comics - debut: Black Panther
1967 in comics - debut: Corto Maltese, Valérian and Laureline, Luc Orient; published: Sgt. Kirk #1
1968 in comics - debut: Maxmagnus, Cubitus, His Name Is... Savage; published: Shonen Jump #1
1969 in comics - debut: Alan Ford, Doraemon; published: Charlie Mensuel #1, Pif gadget #1 (from Vaillant); Čtyřlístek

1970s

1970 in comics - debut: Doonesbury, Natacha, Yoko Tsuno
1971 in comics - debut: Blackmark
1972 in comics - debut: Superdupont, Maus; published: L'Écho des Savannes #1, Wimmen's Comix #1
1973 in comics - debut: Le Génie des alpages, Heathcliff
1974 in comics - debut: Hello Kitty, Herman, Star Reach
1975 in comics - published: Métal Hurlant #1, Fluide Glacial #1, Circus #1
1976 in comics - debut: Adèle Blanc-Sec, American Splendor, Footrot Flats, published: Action #1
1977 in comics - debut: Cerebus the Aardvark, Ms. Marvel, Judge Dredd, Shoe, Idées noires; published: Le Trombone Illustré #1, Heavy Metal #1, 2000 AD
1978 in comics - published: (A SUIVRE) #1; debut: The Adventures of Luther Arkwright, Garfield, A Contract with God
1979 in comics - debut: Jeremiah

1980s

1980 in comics - debut: Bloom County, She-Hulk, Starfire, Cyborg, The Far Side, Raw
1981 in comics - debut: Thrud the Barbarian, Torpedo
1982 in comics - debut: Camelot 3000 (first Maxi-series)
1983 in comics - published: Metropol #1
1984 in comics - debut: Dragon Ball, Teenage Mutant Ninja Turtles
1985 in comics - debut: Calvin and Hobbes
1986 in comics - debut: Watchmen, Dylan Dog, V for Vendetta, The Tick
1987 in comics - debut: Titeuf, Super Commando Dhruva
1988 in comics - debut: The Sandman, Piranha Club
1989 in comics - debut: Outland, Ghost in the Shell

1990s

1990 in comics - debut:
1991 in comics - debut: Ballard Street, Bone, Deadpool
1992 in comics - debut: Non Sequitur, Sailor Moon,  Spawn, Bloodshot
1993 in comics - debut: Hellboy; appearance: Harley Quinn, Static
1994 in comics - debut: Mallard Fillmore, Marvels; first webcomics (NetBoy, Rogues of Clwyd-Rhan)
1995 in comics - debut: Astro City, Over the Hedge
1996 in comics - debut: Birds of Prey, Keyhole, Yu-Gi-Oh!
1997 in comics - debut: One Piece, Hellsing, Naruto;  published: BoDoï #1
1998 in comics - debut: 
1999 in comics - debut: Get Fuzzy, The League of Extraordinary Gentlemen, The Goon

2000s

2000 in comics - debut: 
2001 in comics - debut: Pearls Before Swine
2002 in comics - debut: Invincible
2003 in comics - debut: Opus, Death Note, Wanted, The Walking Dead
2004 in comics - debut: Lucky Star, Scott Pilgrim
2005 in comics - debut: Cyanide and Happiness
2006 in comics - debut: 
2007 in comics - debut: Hark! A Vagrant
2008 in comics - debut: Kick-Ass, Locke & Key
2009 in comics - debut: Attack on Titan, Simon's Cat

2010s

2010 in comics - debut: Hilda, Pusheen, Superior
2011 in comics - debut:
2012 in comics - debut: Nimona
2013 in comics - debut:
2014 in comics - debut: My Hero Academia, Gudetama
2015 in comics - debut:
2016 in comics - debut:
2017 in comics - debut:
2018 in comics - debut: Tap Dance Killer
2019 in comics - debut:

2020s

2020 in comics
2021 in comics
2022 in comics
2023 in comics

See also
List of superhero debuts
List of supervillain debuts
Table of years in comics

References

 
Years
Comics years
Comics
Comics